is a passenger railway station located in the city of Asaka, Saitama, Japan, operated by East Japan Railway Company (JR East).

Lines
The station is located 22.8 kilometers from Fuchūhommachi Station.

Station layout
The station consists of an elevated island platform serving two tracks. The station has a Midori no Madoguchi staffed ticket office. The station has toilet facilities located on the mezzanine level, and both escalator and lift access from the ground level entrance to the elevated platform. Universal access toilets are located outside the station.

Platforms

History
The station opened on 1 April 1973. With the privatization of JNR on 1 April 1987, the station came under the control of JR East.

Costing approximately 200 million yen, work was scheduled to be completed around December 2014.

Passenger statistics
The passenger figures (boarding passengers only) for previous years are as shown below.

Surrounding area
 Asakadai Station (on the Tobu Tojo Line)
 Toyo University Asaka Campus
 Asaka Municipal Museum
 Kita-Asaka Community Centre
 Asakadai Central General Hospital
 Asaka No. 2 Junior High School
 City Inn Kita Asaka

Bus services
Buses from in front of the station are operated by Tobu Bus, Kokusai Kogyo (KKJ), as well as "Wakuwaku" community bus services operated by the city of Asaka.

See also
 List of railway stations in Japan

References

External links

 JR East station information 

Stations of East Japan Railway Company
Railway stations in Saitama Prefecture
Musashino Line
Railway stations in Japan opened in 1973
Asaka, Saitama